Bangana is a Tehsil of Una District in the state of Himachal Pradesh, India. It is  located in the foothills of  Solah Singhi Dhar (Lower Himalayas) in Una District of Himachal Pradesh, India. Ancient forts are located on the top of hill. It is said that Maharaja Sansar Chand built those forts. Lahore can be seen from these forts with the help of telescopes. District headquarters is 28km from here. 
Bangana has further two sub-tehsils Jol and Bihru

History

Historically Bangana was a part of Kutlehar state. Rajput Rajas from Pal Dynasty had ruled this state. After kutlehar state's annexation to Panjab, it becomes part of Kangra district until 1972. After Kangra was trifucated into three parts (Kangra, Hamirpur, Una) then it becomes part of Una and served as tehsil headquarter.

Kutlehar Fort
There is a fort situated near Bangana. It is situated on a hill's top. Lahore can be seen with the help of telescope from this fort. Dhauladhar mountain range can also be seen from this place.

Geography
Generally terrain is hilly as it lies under the Solah Singhi Dhar range.

Transport
It is connected by road to all major towns of Himachal Pradesh. Nearest railway station is at Una and Nearest Airport is Kangra Airport.

Education
There are many government and private schools here. Government Degree college Bangana is higher education centre here. While Una is nearest education hub for the town.

Major Attractions
 Raipur Maidan- Baba garib nath mandir situated on the bank of satluj river near  Gobind sagar reserviour is major attraction for tourist.
 Yogi Panga- Baba Rudranand's temple is major pilgrimage centre.
 Gobind Sagar reserviour- Sceneric beauty of river plays a key role for shootings various occasions like Pre wedding shootings by the epic use of Drones.
 Dhayunsar Mahadev- Lord Shiva's ancient temple. Every year lakhs of devotees visits the temple.
 Kutlehar Fort- It is said that this fort is built by Kangra's great ruler Maharaja Sansar Chand, as Kutlehar was the smallest of all the Kangra Kingdom.

Assembly Constituency
Bangana comes under area of Kutlehar Vidhan Sabha Constituency. Congress and Bhartiya Janta Party are major political parties here. Sh. Veerendra Kanwar is current MLA of the constituency from last 19 years.

References

Una, Himachal Pradesh